Debrecen is a district in central part of Hajdú-Bihar County. Debrecen is also the name of the town where the district seat is found. The district is located in the Northern Great Plain Statistical Region.

Geography 
Debrecen District borders with Hajdúböszörmény District, Hajdúhadház District and Nagykálló District (Szabolcs-Szatmár-Bereg County) to the north, Nyíradony District to the east, Derecske District to the south, Hajdúszoboszló District and Balmazújváros District to the west. The number of the inhabited places in Debrecen District is 2.

Municipalities 
The district has 1 urban county, 1 town.
(ordered by population, as of 1 January 2012)

The bolded municipalities are cities.

Demographics

In 2011, it had a population of 224,448 and the population density was 423/km².

Ethnicity
Besides the Hungarian majority, the main minorities are the Roma (approx. 2,000), German (1,300), Romanian (800), Arab (350), Russian and Ukrainian (300), Bulgarian (200), Rusyn, Slovak, Polish, Armenian, Greek and Serb (100).

Total population (2011 census): 224,448
Ethnic groups (2011 census): Identified themselves: 200,417 persons:
Hungarians: 190,831 (95.22%)
Others and indefinable: 9,586 (4.78%)
Approx. 24,000 persons in Debrecen District did not declare their ethnic group at the 2011 census.

Religion
Religious adherence in the county according to 2011 census:

Reformed – 56,252;
Catholic – 35,782 (Roman Catholic – 24,422; Greek Catholic – 11,339);
Evangelical – 820;
other religions – 5,571;
Non-religious – 58,858; 
Atheism – 3,975;
Undeclared – 63,190.

Gallery

See also
List of cities and towns of Hungary

References

External links
 Postal codes of the Debrecen District

Districts in Hajdú-Bihar County